Aaliyah Fasavalu-Fa'amausili (born 21 December 2000) is an Australian rugby league footballer who plays for the St George Illawarra Dragons in the NRL Women's Premiership and the South Sydney Rabbitohs in the NSWRL Women's Premiership.

Background
Born in Westmead, New South Wales, Fasavalu-Fa'amausili began playing rugby league for the Auburn Warriors when she was 11.

Playing career
In 2017, Fasavalu-Fa'amausili played for the Canterbury-Bankstown Bulldogs in the Tarsha Gale Cup. In 2018, she moved to the St George Illawarra Dragons Tarsha Gale Cup team and was named as a development player for the Dragons' NRL Women's Premiership team. On 6 October 2018, she played for the Prime Minister's XIII in their 40–4 win over Papua New Guinea.

2019
In May, Fasavalu-Fa'amausili represented NSW City at the Women's National Championships. On 18 June, she re-signed with the Dragons, joining their full NRLW squad.

In Round 2 of the 2019 NRL Women's season, she made her debut for the Dragons in their 26–6 win over the New Zealand Warriors. On 6 October, she started on the bench in the Dragons' 6–30 Grand Final loss to the Brisbane Broncos.

2020
In 2020, she played for the Canterbury-Bankstown Bulldogs in the NSWRL Women's Premiership. In Round 3 of the 2020 NRL Women's season, she scored her first NRLW try in the Dragons' 10–22 loss to the New Zealand Warriors.

References

External links
St George Illawarra Dragons profile

2000 births
Living people
Australian sportspeople of Samoan descent
Australian female rugby league players
Rugby league props
Rugby league hookers
St. George Illawarra Dragons (NRLW) players